al-Khalidiya or al-Khalidiyah ("belonging to Khalid") may refer to:
 al-Khalidiya, Iraq, a city in Iraq
 al-Khalidiya, Kuwait City, a suburb of Kuwait City
 al-Khalidiya, Mecca, a district in Mecca, Saudi Arabia
 al-Khalidiyah, al-Hasakah Governorate or Khanik, the easternmost settlement of Syria
 al-Khalidiyah, Syria, another village in Syria

Khalidiya or Khalidiyah may also refer to:
 Khalidiyah Mall in Abu Dhabi

See also 
 Khalidiyya, a  Naqshbandiyya Sufi lineage
 Khalidi (surname)
 Khalid (disambiguation)